The men's giant slalom competition of the Vancouver 2010 Olympics was held at Whistler Creekside in Whistler, British Columbia. Originally scheduled for February 21, it was rescheduled to February 23, due to delays of preceding alpine events.

Carlo Janka of Switzerland won the gold, with Kjetil Jansrud of Norway taking the silver medal. Fellow countryman Aksel Lund Svindal won the bronze, his third medal at the 2010 Winter Olympics.

Results

References 

Giant slalom
Winter Olympics